Astragon Entertainment GmbH is a German video game publisher based in Düsseldorf, Germany. Originally a subsidiary of the German video game distributor Astragon Sales & Services GmbH (formerly Rondomedia Marketing & Vertriebs GmbH). The company become known for being the original worldwide publisher of the Farming Simulator series and continues to do so in German territories.

They were originally headquartered in Hagen but moved to Mönchengladbach in 2004. Astragon formerly specialised in publishing simulation games for Microsoft Windows, but in 2008 they moved into other areas, when they published more casual games like Wendy: Holidays at Rosenborg for the Nintendo DS.

They have released several English language games under their Just Play It! label, including Myst IV: Revelation and CSI: Dark Motives. Astragon publish games by Big Fish Games and iWin in the German language market.

Currently, the company is primarily focused on publishing simulation games for a variety of platforms. Titles include the Construction Simulator series (for PC, Mac, PlayStation 4, Xbox One, Nintendo Switch, iOS and Android), the Bus Simulator series (for PC, PS4 and Xbox One), the Farming Simulator series (for PC, Mac, PlayStation 4, Xbox One and Nintendo Switch) and additional titles like commercial fishing simulation Fishing: Barents Sea, the upcoming Firefighting Simulator and FPV drone racing simulation game Liftoff: Drone Racing and Police Simulator: Patrol Officers.

In September 2015, Astragon became the 100th GAME member of the association of the German games industry called GAME – Bundesverband der deutschen Games-Branche e.V..

In 2019, the company moved to Düsseldorf.  In July 2021, the two companies merged and now operate as astragon Entertainment.

In January 2022, the company was acquired by Team17 in a deal worth £83 million.

Computer software
In addition, Astragon publishes computer software. They have published archiving software, educational CDs, multimedia tools and some design programs.

PC Games 

 Water Park Tycoon
 Farming Simulator 22
 Police Simulator: Patrol Officers
 Bus Simulator 21
 Bus Simulator 18
 Bus Simulator 16
 Bus Simulator
 Firefighting Simulator
 Railroads Online

References

External links
 Official website 
 MobyGames database (As 'astragon Sales & Services GmbH')

Companies based in Düsseldorf
Video game companies of Germany
Video game publishers
Video game companies established in 2000
German companies established in 2000
2022 mergers and acquisitions
Team17